On 14 October 2004, Pádraig Nally, an Irish farmer living in County Mayo, Republic of Ireland shot dead Irish Traveller John "Frog" Ward, who had been trespassing on his property. In November 2005 Nally was sentenced to six years' imprisonment for manslaughter. His conviction was quashed in October 2006 and, after a retrial in December 2006, he was found not guilty of manslaughter.

First trial
The Central Criminal Court decided to hear the Nally case in Castlebar, making it the first murder trial in Mayo for almost a century; the jury was chosen from a pool of more than 200 locals. Travellers' support groups criticised the bias because of the jury's composition, arguing that the murder trial should have been afforded a more independent and objective forum. A member of the Law Reform Commission concurred that there was strong case to have such trials take place in Dublin.

Ward was a 43-year-old Traveller with approximately 80 convictions from 38 separate court appearances and had convictions for burglary, larceny and assault. John "Frog" Ward had twice been committed to hospital for psychiatric treatment. In 1999, he threatened a barman with a Stanley knife. Ward attacked a car with a slash hook while a woman and two children were inside. Ward had threatened Gardaí in an incident in May 2002 and with a slash, in April 2002. At the time of his death he was facing charges of attacking Gardaí with a slash hook. The court heard that a post-mortem examination and toxicology tests on Mr Ward's body found traces of cannabis, opiates and tranquillisers. It was also emphasised that Mr Ward had been receiving hospital treatment and was on medication for a condition. The Prime Time Special (RTÉ flagship current affairs programme) brought forward new evidence showing that John Ward had a long criminal record dating back over 30 years and revealed that four bench warrants for John Ward's arrest were outstanding at the time of his death.

Tom Ward, the chief witness for the prosecution, was himself serving an eleven-month sentence at the time of the trial, for possessing a knife and for theft.

During the first trial, the court heard that Nally had become increasingly agitated and worried that his property would be targeted by local thieves as a number of farms in the area had recently been burgled. His own home had been broken into in 2003 and a chainsaw stolen from one of his sheds in February 2004. Other items had disappeared from around his house and farm. This caused him to be unable to sleep properly. Following the break-in in February 2004 he had kept a gun in a garage and had started to keep registration numbers of strange cars travelling through the district. Friends and neighbours noted Nally had become preoccupied with looking after his farm and terrified that the robbers would return. He told the jury he was at the end of his tether and, according to counsel, was "agitated and fearful, even paranoid" about his safety. "Did he suddenly, after 60 years, become a murderer?" asked Brendan Grehan, Nally's lawyer, describing his client as a law-abiding member of his community who acted in self-defence.

Nally alleged he had met John "Frog" Ward previously when Ward had called to his house two weeks before 14 October and had enquired if it would be a good day for fishing. Ward, said Nally, had no fishing tackle with him and this led him to be suspicious of Ward. He did not like the look of him.

Under cross-examination, Tom Ward denied a suggestion that his father was a bare knuckle boxer, and he said he had no knowledge of a suggestion his father had threatened a Garda with a slashhook. Tom Ward said that on the evening of 13 October 2004 he had bought the car he and his father had travelled in to Pádraig Nally's house the following day. He said he had bought it from other travellers, but he declined to give the court any names. Pádraig Nally's barrister had earlier stated a car bearing a similar description had previously been seen in the vicinity of Cross a short distance from where a chainsaw was reported stolen.

According to Marie Cassidy, the state pathologist, John Ward, a Galway traveller, was shot twice on 14 October 2004. The first shot injured John Ward in the hand and hip. The second shot was fired from above and John Ward was in a crouched position at the time. The person who shot him was standing over him and the shot was fired at close range. Nally said in evidence he was afraid Ward would kill him, which was why he fired the second shot (to frighten him [Ward]).

The Defense argued provocation, as Nally could have reasonably assumed John Ward had been responsible for the theft of the chainsaw and perhaps the numerous other thefts since, as Mr. Nally recognised the vehicle outside his home on 14 October as that bearing the description of the one seen in the vicinity of his home the day his chainsaw was stolen (in 2003). The provocation was, seemingly, the fact that Nally's house had been burgled some time previously, that Ward had called to his house some weeks previously and had acted suspiciously and that Ward was on his premises on 14 October, without authorisation.

Nally pleaded not guilty to murder and manslaughter charges. He was acquitted of murder, but convicted of manslaughter. The judge, Mr Justice Paul Carney, refused to allow the jury to consider a full defence argument of self-defence.

Sentencing Nally to six years for the manslaughter conviction, Mr Justice Paul Carney said: "This is undoubtedly the most socially divisive case I have had to try. It is also the most difficult one in which I have had to impose sentence.". The judge said he would take into consideration Nally's unblemished past, his low risk of re-offending, his willingness to show remorse for his crime and the fact that the prosecution's case was based largely on testaments given by the farmer.

Appeal 

Nally was refused leave to appeal by the Central Criminal Court against his conviction and six-year jail sentence.

The case was then appealed to the Court of Criminal Appeal. Nally's lawyers had argued at his appeal that the trial judge had erred in law by not allowing the jury to consider a defence of full self-defence and by not allowing it to find Nally not guilty. He had directed that the jury had to find Nally guilty of murder or guilty of manslaughter, and ruled that an acquittal verdict based on the evidence would be perverse.

In October 2006, the Court of Criminal Appeal quashed Pádraig Nally's conviction for manslaughter and ordered a retrial. The Court said that the jury should not have been denied the opportunity to return a verdict of not guilty, even if such a verdict may have flown in the face of the evidence.

Retrial

Pádraig Nally's retrial took place in December 2006. Similar evidence was submitted to the court, including evidence of Ward's character and previous convictions and both Nally's and Ward's mental states on the day in question.

The jury of eight men and four women acquitted Nally of manslaughter and he walked free.

Legacy
In 2009, the government announced its plan to introduce a new law of self-defence in 2010 upon recommendation by the Law Reform Commission which would codify the existing common law position on the use of force in defence of property. The Criminal Law (Defence and the Dwelling) Act 2011 was enacted on 19 December 2011.

Although widely heralded as "allowing" homeowners to exercise reasonable force in defending their home, the Act in fact did nothing to change the legal position as it existed at the time of Nally's trial, other than to place the previous common law jurisprudence on a statutory footing.

See also
Castle doctrine
Defence of property
Joe Horn shooting controversy
1984 New York City Subway shooting
Tony Martin (farmer)
Munir Hussain case

References

External links
 RTE News: Mixed Reaction to Nally Acquittal
 Cork FM Coverage of First Conviction

Ward, John
Ward, John
Defensive gun use
Irish Traveller-related controversies
2004 in the Republic of Ireland